NGC 752 (also known as Caldwell 28) is an open cluster in the constellation Andromeda. The cluster was discovered by Caroline Herschel in 1783 and cataloged by her brother William Herschel in 1786, although an object that may have been NGC 752 was described by Giovanni Batista Hodierna before 1654.

The large cluster lies 1,300 light-years away from the Earth and is easily seen through binoculars, although it may approach naked eye visibility under good observing conditions. A telescope reveals about 60 stars no brighter than 9th magnitude within NGC 752.

Components
The most up-to-date research lists 258 stars as members of NGC 752. Since the age of the cluster is  Gyr, they are low mass stars in the main sequence or red giant phase. A blue straggler star is also present, along with some spectroscopic binaries and variable stars. The detached eclipsing binary DS Andromedae is a member of this cluster.

Images

Notable stars

References

External links 

 SEDS – NGC 752
 perseus.gr – NGC 752 in a hires LRGB CCD image

Open clusters
Andromeda (constellation)
0752
028
Discoveries by Caroline Herschel